Kühne is the surname of several notable people:

 Alfred von Kühne (1853-1945), a German general during World War I
Walter Georg Kühne (1911–1991), a German paleontologist
 Wilhelm Kühne (1837–1900), a German physiologist
 Hans Kühne (1880–1969), a German chemist
 Wilhelm Otto Kühne (1924–1988), a South African writer
 Thomas Kühne (born 1958), a German historian
 Rainer Walter Kühne (born 1970), a German theoretical physicist
 Louis Kuhne (1835–1901), a German naturopath
 Friedrich Kühne (1870–1959), a German film actor of the silent era
 Otto Kühne (1893–1955) a German antifascist militant
 The German brothers Veit and Kjell Kühne (born 1978 and 1979), founders of the Hospitality Club and their brother Kay Kühne founder of the site Panfu.
 Eric Kuhne (1951–2016), an American-born British architect based in London
 Helmut Kuhne (born 1949), a German politician and Member of the European Parliament
 Roy Kühne (born 1967), German politician

Sports 
 Rita Kuhne (born 1947), a former East German athlete who competed mainly in the 400 metres.
 Frank Kühne (born 1961), a German swimmer
 Marc Kühne (born 1976), a German bobsledder who has competed since 1998
 Stefan Kühne (born 1980), a German football coach and former football midfielder
 Anke Kühne (born 1981), a female field hockey player from Germany
 Rico Kühne (born 1982), a German former footballer
 Matthias Kühne (born 1987), a German footballer who plays for Carl Zeiss Jena
 Simon Kühne (born 1994), a Liechtensteiner international footballer who plays for USV Eschen/Mauren, as a winger

Business 
 August Kühne (1855–1932), a German businessman, the co-founder of Kuehne + Nagel
 Alfred Kühne (1895–1981), a German businessman, the son of August Kühne
 Klaus-Michael Kühne (born 1937), honorary chairman and majority owner (53.30%) of the international transport company Kühne + Nagel

 Altmann & Kühne, a confiserie and chocolaterie in Vienna, Austria, established in 1928.
 Carl Kühne KG, a German food company based in Hamburg, founded in 1722.
 Kühne Logistics University, based in Schindellegi, Switzerland
 Karls kühne Gassenschau is in the widest sense a Swiss circus, variété or street theatre, as of April 2016 based in Winterthur
 Carl Kühne KG, German food company

See also
 Wilhelm Kühne (disambiguation)

German-language surnames